Triglav is a  operated by the 430th Naval Section of the Slovenian Armed Forces. It is a small, multi-role craft capable of maritime patrol, supporting diver operations, coastal survey, search and rescue and combat. It has twice been deployed outside Slovenian territorial waters in concert with other NATO naval forces.

History

In 2008, Slovenia agreed to the acquisition of one  in exchange for discharging a multimillion-dollar debt owed by Russia. The ship was laid down in 2009, completed in 2011, and delivered to Slovenia the same year. It was named Triglav after Slovenia's  highest mountain and national symbol. The ship's armament was optimized for a patrol role, lacking the anti-ship missiles of the standard Svetlyak. In late 2012, this capability was restored by mounting six 9M120 anti-ship missiles. In summer 2015, Triglav underwent an overhaul in the Trieste shipyard.

Deployments
Triglav was sent to eastern Sicily on 15 December 2013 to assist Italy with refugees from Africa as part of Operation Mare Nostrum.

In October 2015, the vessel was sent to southern Italy as a part of the European Union's Operation Sophia. Triglav successfully carried out its first rescue operation on 28 October, recovering 100 people (71 male, 17 female, and 12 children).

In May 2018 the ship suffered a major engine breakdown at the start of its deployment to the Mediterranean.

Armament & equipment
 1x  AK-306 gun mount (AK-176M gun can be mounted in the bow section)
 2x 14.5mm machine guns
 6x 9M120 anti-ship missile system
 16x Igla-type MANPADS
 PK-10 anti-missile projectiles
 FR-2150W navigational radar
 Gorizont-25 integrated navigation system
 GAGK1 Pastilshchik-D gyroazimuth/horizon compass
 KM-69M1 magnetic compass
 LEMM-2-2 electromagnetic log with echosounder functions
 AP-5 dead-reckoning tracer
 RN-1 radio range-finder
 KPI-9F receiver-indicator of ground-based radio-navigation systems
 NT-200D shipborne satellite navigation equipment
 Buran-6E automated communications system

References

 Russia Delivers New Patrol Ship “Triglav” to Slovenian Navy
 Technical details
 Triglav in Sicily

Svetlyak-class patrol boats of the Slovenian Navy
Ships built by Almaz Shipbuilding Company